The following is list of beaches in the U.S. states, the District of Columbia, and the U.S. territories.

Beaches occur both on the ocean shoreline and inland on lakes, rivers, etc. This list is organized by major coastline. States with large numbers of beaches are listed on linked subarticles.

Mainland Atlantic states and federal district

Maine

New Hampshire

Massachusetts

Rhode Island

Connecticut

New York

New Jersey 

Allenhurst
Asbury Park
Atlantic City
Avalon
Avon-by-the-Sea
Barnegat Light
Bay Head
Beach Haven
Belmar
Bradley Beach
Brick
Brigantine
Cape May
Cape May Point
Corson's Inlet State Park (Strathmere)
Deal
Gunnison Beach
Harvey Cedars
Island Beach State Park (Berkeley Twp.)
Lavallette
Loch Arbour
Long Beach
Long Branch
Longport
Manasquan
Mantoloking
Margate City
Monmouth Beach
North Wildwood
Ocean City
Ocean Grove (Neptune)
Ortley Beach (Toms River)
Point Pleasant Beach
Sandy Hook (Highlands)
Sea Bright
Sea Girt
Sea Isle City
Seaside Heights
Seaside Park
Seven Presidents Oceanfront Park (Long Branch)
Ship Bottom
Spring Lake
Stone Harbor
Strathmere (Upper Twp.)
Surf City
Ventnor City
Villas (Lower Twp.)
West Wildwood
Wildwood
Wildwood Crest

District of Columbia

The District of Columbia does not currently have a true beach; several areas (such as Georgetown Waterfront Park) have boundaries along the Potomac river, but lack a true beach. From 1914 to 1925, there was a beach at the District of Columbia’s tidal basin.

Delaware

Maryland 
Ocean City
Assateague Island

Virginia 
Buckroe Beach
Chincoteague
Colonial Beach
Ocean View
Virginia Beach
Bhutto Beach

North Carolina 

Atlantic Beach
Avon
Buxton
Cape Hatteras
Carolina Beach
Caswell Beach
Corolla
Duck
Emerald Isle
Holden Beach
Indian Beach
Kure Beach
Long Beach
Hatteras
Nags Head
North Topsail Beach
Oak Island
Ocean Isle Beach
Ocracoke
Pine Knoll Shores
Portsmouth
Rodanthe
Salter Path
Salvo
Southern Shores
Sunset Beach
Surf City
Waves
Wrightsville Beach
Yaupon Beach

South Carolina 
Atlantic Beach
Cherry Grove Beach
Edisto Beach
Folly Beach
Garden City
Hilton Head Island
 Isle of Palms
Kiawah Island
Litchfield Beach
Myrtle Beach
North Myrtle Beach
Pawleys Island
Seabrook Island
Springmaid Beach
Sullivan’s Island
Surfside Beach

Georgia 
Cumberland Island
Jekyll Island
St. Simons Island
Sapelo Island
Sea Island
Tybee Island

Florida 

Atlantic Beach
Bahia Honda Key
Beverly Beach
Boca Chica
Boca Raton
Boynton Beach
Butler Beach
Clearwater Beach
Cocoa Beach
Crescent Beach
Dania Beach
Daytona Beach
Destin
Fernandina Beach
Fort Myers Beach
Fort Walton Beach
Flagler Beach
Grayton Beach
Gulf Stream
Gulf Breeze
Hallandale Beach
Haulover Park
Highland Beach
Hillsboro Beach
Hobe Sound
Hollywood
Hollywood Beach
Holmes Beach
Indiatlantic
Indian Harbour Beach
Indian River Shores
Indian Rocks Beach
Jacksonville Beach
Jensen Beach
Juno Beach
Jupiter
Key Biscayne
Key Largo
Key West
Lake Worth
Madeira Beach
Marathon
Marco Island
Melbourne Beach
Miami Beach
Miramar Beach
Moorings Village
Naples
Navarre Beach
New Smyrna Beach
Neptune Beach
North Palm Beach
Orchid
Ormond Beach
Palm Beach
Palm Beach Shores
Palm Coast
Panama City Beach
Pensacola Beach
Perdido Key
Pompano Beach
Ponce Inlet
Ponte Verda Beach
Riviera Beach
Santa Rosa Beach
Satellite Beach
Sarasota
Seaside
Siesta Key Beach
Sombrero Beach
South Beach
St. Augustine Beach
St. George Island Beach
St. Pete Beach
Stuart
Sunny Isles Beach
Tigertail Beach
Vanderbilt Beach
Vero Beach
Vilano Beach
Wabasso Beach
Watercolor
John C. Beasley Park

Gulf of Mexico states 
(east to west, excluding Florida)

Alabama 
Dauphin Island
Gulf Shores
Orange Beach
Fairhope
Fort Morgan

Mississippi 
Biloxi
Gulfport
Long Beach
Ocean Springs
Pascagoula
Pass Christian
Bay Saint Louis
Waveland
Ship Island, Mississippi
Horn Island
Petit Bois Island
Cat Island, Mississippi

Louisiana 
Grand Isle
Holly Beach
Chandeleur Islands
Cypremort Point State Park

Texas 

Galveston
Mustang Island
Padre Island
South Padre Island
Surfside Beach

Mainland Pacific states 
(northwest to southeast)

Alaska 
Bishop’s Beach
Black Sand Beach (Barry Arm)
Goose Lake (Anchorage)
Kincaid Beach
Nome Beach
Nunathloogagamiutbingoi Dunes
Summer Bay Beach

Washington 
Alki Beach
Ocean Shores

Oregon

California

Island states and territories

American Samoa 

Alao Beach & Tula Beach
Alega Beach
Aunu’u Beach
Faleasao Beach
Freddie’s Beach
Ofu Beach
Palagi Beach
Sa’ilele Beach
Two-Dollar Beach (Avaio Beach)
Utulei Beach Park
Vatia Beach

Guam 

Agat Invasion Beach
Asan Beach
Dadi Beach
Faifai Beach
First Beach
Gab Gab Beach
Gun Beach
Haputo Beach
Ipan Beach
Mushroom Rock Hilaan Beach
Ritidian Beach
Shark Cove Beach
Tagachang Beach
Talofofo Beach (Surf Side Beach / Black Sand Beach)
Tanguisson Beach
Tumon Beach
Ypao Beach

Hawaii 

D.T. Fleming Beach, Maui
Kee Beach, Kauai
Hanauma Bay Nature Preserve, Oahu
Hapuna Beach State Recreation Area, Hawaii Island
Kaanapali Beach, Maui
Kahulu’u Beach Park, Hawaii Island
Kailua, Oahu
Mauna Kea Beach, Hawaii Island
Kekaha Kai Beach, Hawaii Island
Lumaha'i Beach 
Green Sands Beach, Hawaii Island
Punaluʻu Beach (Black Sand Beach), Hawaii Island
Sunset Beach, Oahu
Waimea Beach, Oahu
Waikiki Beach, Oahu

Northern Mariana Islands 

Mañagaha Beach
Micro Beach
Obyan Beach
Pau Pau Beach
Lam Lam Beach (Tinian)
Laulau Beach
Mochong Beach (Rota)
Tanapag Beach
Tank Beach
Tweksberry Beach (Rota)
Wing Beach

Puerto Rico 

Balneario de Rincón
Boquerón Beach
Crash Boat Beach
Domes Beach
El Tuque
Flamenco Beach
La Pocita de las Golondrinas Beach
Luquillo Beach
Playa Espinar

U.S. Minor Outlying Islands 

Beaches at Midway Atoll
Beaches at Palmyra Atoll
Beach ringing Navassa Island

U.S. Virgin Islands

Great Lakes states 
(west to east except the Michigan Upper Peninsula)

Minnesota 
Cedar Lake East Beach
McCarthy Beach State Park
Minnesota Point (Park Point)

Wisconsin
Bradford Beach
Mazo Beach
Point Beach
Door County, Wisconsin § Beaches

Illinois 

Illinois Beach State Park

Indiana 
Indiana Dunes National Park
Whihala Beach County Park

Michigan 
Duck Lake State Park
Grand Haven Beach
Hoffmaster State Park
Holland Beach
McLain State Park
Muskegon Beach
Orchard Beach
Pere Marquette Park Beach
Oval Beach
Saugatuck Dunes Beach
Sleeping Bear Dunes National Lakeshore
South Haven Beach
Van Buren State Park
Warren Dunes Beach
Metro Beach

Ohio 
Cleveland Metroparks
Headlands Beach State Park
Walnut Beach Park (Ashtabula)

Pennsylvania 
Erie
Presque Isle

New York

Other inland states 
(alphabetical)

Arizona 

Lake Havasu State Park beaches

Idaho 
Bear Lake State Park (North Beach State Park)
Coeur d’Alene City Park and Beach

Montana 
Whitefish City Beach
Whitefish Lake State Park
NASIK CITY PARK

Nevada 
Nevada Beach (Lake Tahoe)
Sand Harbor Beach (Lake Tahoe)
Whale Beach (Lake Tahoe)

New Mexico 
Lake Carlsbad Beach Park

North Dakota 
Beaver Lake State Park beach
Lake Metigoshe State Park beach

Utah 
Rendezvous Beach

Vermont

West Virginia 

Bee Run Beach (Sutton Lake Marina)
Shaw Beach (Jennings Randolph Lake)

Wyoming

Boysen State Park Beach
Sandy Beach (Fremont Lake)

See also 
List of beaches
Lists of landforms of the United States

References

 

US
US
US
US
US
US
US
US
US
US
US
US
US
US
US
US
US
US
US
US
US
US
US
US
US
US
US
Beaches
US
US
US
US
US